Yankovo is a village in Eastern Bulgaria, part of the Smyadovo municipality of Shumen Province. It is located on the Kamchiya river.

Yankovo has an area of 34.535 km2. The village is 9 km away from Smyadovo, the closest settlement is Byal Bryag across the Kamchiya.

References

Villages in Shumen Province